Splash was a German Eurodance group active in the first half of the 1990s, which consisted of founder/producers Giorgio and Martin Koppehele (G. + M. Cope), with Marcus Deon Thomas a.k.a. Eric P. III and Aimee McCoy as its singers.

Career
The project started in 1990 with the single "I Need Rhythm", followed by the singles "Set the Groove on Fire" and "Joy and Pain" in 1991. They released their self-titled debut album in 1991, under WEA (subsidiary of Warner Music Group).

The single "Got 2 Have Your Love" was released in 1992 on the label Nu Trax, followed by "Tell Me Why" (featuring Asher D.) in 1993, and "All I Do" (1994) and "One More Dream" in 1994. Their second album Just a Party was also released that year.

After the group's demise, Marcus Deon Thomas joined the group Pharao with singer Kyra Pharao, where he became known under the alias Deon Blue. Aimee McCoy ended her singing career.

Discography

Albums

Singles

References

External links 

 MusicBrainz
 The Eurodance Encyclopedia

German dance music groups
German electronic music groups
German Eurodance groups
German house music groups
Hip house music groups
Musical groups established in 1990